is a song recorded by Japanese duo Yoasobi. It was released on May 30, 2022, through Sony Music Entertainment Japan, as the second song following "Mr." from the novel collection project Hajimete no. Based on the project's novel written by 135th Naoki Prize-winning Eto Mori, Hikari no Tane, the song depicts a high school girl's fourth confession to her crush while efforts to erase her past confessions by time travel. Commercially, "Suki da" peaked at number 23 on the Oricon Combined Singles Chart, and number eight on the Billboard Japan Hot 100. The music video, directed by Kazuaki Seki, was uploaded on November 13.

Background and release

On December 1, 2021, the same date as their EP The Book 2 release, Yoasobi announced the project Hajimete no, a collaboration between the duo and four Naoki Prize-winning novelists: Rio Shimamoto, Mizuki Tsujimura, Miyuki Miyabe, and Eto Mori, to produce songs based on the authors' novel under the theme of "a story to read when you first did". All four novels were published as a book, titled Hajimete no, on February 16, 2022. One of four novels with the theme "a story when you first confess" by Mori, depicts the story of Yuma, a high school girl who falls in love with her childhood friend Shiita for over ten years. She tries to erase her past confessions by journeying through time and space to confirm her fourth confession for him.

On May 22, shortly after the music video of "Mr." premiered, Yoasobi uploaded the promotional video to announce the second song from Hajimete no series, titled "Suki da", based on Mori's novel. It shows Ikura's voice reading Hikari no Tane with texts from the story and several photos of Hajimete no book covers. The song was available for digital music and streaming platforms on May 30. Before the release, it was teased at all 7-Eleven branches in Japan from May 23, alongside the duo's comments about it. Created by Moe Yoshino, the cover artwork shows a collage of colorful imaginary flowers.

Composition

"Suki da" is described as a mid-tempo "sensational" love pop song, expressing the protagonist's fourth attempt to confess her crush, who is her childhood friend, while struggling across space and time to erase her past love confessions. Mori said that the song depicts the protagonist's misunderstanding, awareness, and determination and reflects "thinking about someone from the bottom of [her] heart". The song was written by Ayase, a member who handles a production of the duo, composed in the key of E minor, 120 beats per minute with a running time of three minutes and thirty-seven seconds. The key of the three choruses all different, reflecting the ups and downs of the emotions.

Music video

An accompanying music video for "Suki da" was initially set to premiere on November 6, 2022, but had been postponed to the 13th due to production reasons. The music video was directed by Kazuaki Seki, portraying the plot of Hikari no Tanes illustration.

Commercial performance

"Suki da" debuted at number 23 on the Oricon Combined Singles Chart. Additionally, the song landed at number one on the Oricon Digital Singles (Single Track) Chart, selling 14,639 downloads in its first week. It became the ninth number-one song on the Digital Singles Chart and marked Yoasobi as the second most number-one artist on the chart, behind only Kenshi Yonezu, who has 10 songs. "Suki da" entered the Billboard Japan Hot 100 at number eight, earned 12,558 downloads, charted at number three on the Download Chart; and 2,623,457 streams, peaked at number 39 on the Streaming Chart, on its first week.

Live performances and usage in media

Yoasobi performed "Suki da" live for the first time at the Rock in Japan Festival on August 6, 2022, and the Rising Sun Rock Festival on the 12th.

On September 7, "Suki da" was chosen to accompany the hair care product Ichikami advertisement, starring Mei Nagano, and Yoshiaki Higashi. On the same day, Yoasobi also released the debut performance of the song from the 2022 Rock in Japan Festival to commemorate the collaboration.

Credits and personnel
Song and other
 Ayase – songwriter, producer
 Ikura – vocals
 AssH – acoustic guitar
 Eto Mori – based story writer
 Moe Yoshino – cover artwork design

Music video

 Misobata Shoojoo – character design, animation director, art director
 Kazuaki Seki – director
 Kenji Yoshino (Soda!) – producer
 Kyōhei Yamada (Soda!) – production manager
 Maho Shibao (Soda!) – production assistant
 Kenji Itoso (Kenji Studio) – animation director, photography
 Shintarō Matsushima (Gyorai Eizo) – lead animator
 Tomoyuki Suzuki (Nonki Beam) – dance part animation
 Kōki Sakashita – dance part animation
 Kazuo Mita (Nonki Beam) – dance part animation
 Yūya Takahashi – dance animation
 Kiseki Soshi – dance animation
 Ami Fujikawa – animation
 Kimi Onimaru – animation 
 Zhao Yitong – animation
 Ayano Maehana – animation
 Ai Tanabe – animation
 Yuki Arita – animation
 Ayaka Oda – animation
 Sora Naka – animation
 Saki Kodera – animation
 Moe Katō – animation
 Airi Shibata – animation
 Airi Miyazaki – animation
 Yukie Tsujioka – animation
 Hibiki Harada – animation
 Sakurai Ihara – animation
 Natsuki Matsuoka – animation
 Kazuomi Saito – animation
 Rotus – animation
 Hiroki Moroi – animation
 Yoshika Sakamoto – animation
 Yasuki Murakami – animation
 Gitarō Seki – animation
 Sayae Abe – animation
 Masato Ōta (Asurafilm) – animation
 Eri Okazaki (Calf) – animation
 Shuma Hirose (Calf) – animation
 Yūko Nojiri – director of photography
 Shintarō Kojima – photography
 Kana Miyashita – photography
 Furitsukekagyou-Air:Man – dance part choreography
 Tōru Hirata (Regato) – animation producer
 Ryōta Sano (Gyorai Eizo) – line producer
 Yūki Matsuda (Asurafilm) – line producer
 Kazuma Ichinose (Gyorai Eizo) – assistant producer
 Jōnetsu Otoko – production assistant
 Genki Akiyama – planner
 Chiaki Kobayashi – planner
 Yūta Sawada – planner
 Juntarō Naruke – planner
 Motoatsu Mibu – producer
 Noriaki Onoe – advisor
 Osaka Seikei University – cooperation
 Calf – animation cooperation
 Asurafilm – animation cooperation
 Kenji Studio – animation work
 Regaro – animation work
 Gyorai Eizo – animation work
 Aqua Star – animation work
 Kurumi Kaneko – animation work
 Yūki Ōmori (Ond°) – editor
 Ganda Akagi (Ond°) – editor
 Soda! Communications Inc. – work

Charts

Release history

References

External links
 

2022 singles
2022 songs
Japanese-language songs
Sony Music Entertainment Japan singles
Songs about time travel
Yoasobi songs